Milk Duds are a brand of chocolate-coated caramel candies produced by The Hershey Company. The candy is a caramel disk covered with a confectionery chocolate coating made from cocoa and vegetable oil. Milk Duds are sold in a yellowish-orange box. 

According to the manufacturer, the word "Milk" in the candy's name refers to the large amount of milk in the product; the use of "dud" came about because the original aim of having a spherical shape wasn't achievable. Milk Duds were first created in 1928.

History 

In 1928, Hoffman and Company of Chicago tried to manufacture a spherical, chocolate-covered caramel candy. Because they were unsuccessful in achieving the spherical shape, the candies were called "duds". This inspired the candy's name, "Milk Duds". In the same year, Holloway took over Hoffman and Company and the production of Milk Duds.

In 1960 Holloway sold Hoffman and Co. to Beatrice Foods.

In 1986, Leaf purchased the Milk Duds business. In 1992, production of Milk Duds candy was moved to Leaf Candy Company's Robinson, Illinois plant.

In 1996, Leaf's North American confectionery operation was acquired by Hershey Foods Corporation of Hershey, Pennsylvania.

In 2022, Milk Duds launched a web-based marketing campaign where the official website became a small overlay to view different social media sites in the main area, including its official  Twitter account @MilkDudsUS.

Changes to ingredients

In 2008, the Hershey Company changed the ingredients of some of its products to replace the relatively expensive cocoa butter used with cheaper oil substitutes. This was done to retain a current product price, rather than having to raise prices in the marketplace for products containing cocoa butter.

Hershey's changed the description of the product and altered the packaging slightly, along with the ingredients. According to United States Food and Drug Administration food labeling laws, these modified recipes that do not contain cocoa butter can not be legally described as candy-coated in milk chocolate and are instead described as "chocolate candy" or as having "chocolate coating."

See also
 List of chocolate-covered foods

References

External links

 

 

The Hershey Company brands
Products introduced in 1928
Chocolate-covered foods
Brand name confectionery